Sir William Osler High School (SWOHS), formerly Sir William Osler Vocational school is a small specialized public vocational high school in Toronto, Ontario, Canada. Located in the former suburb of Scarborough, it opened in 1975, and is named after Sir William Osler, a Canadian doctor and medical educator.

Notable faculty
Joseph Valtellini

References

External links

High schools in Toronto
Educational institutions in Canada with year of establishment missing
Education in Scarborough, Toronto